The Dirigible/Balloon Pilot Insignia was a military decoration of the United States Navy and United States Marine Corps that was issued to those service members who received training and qualification as dirigible pilots.  The badge first appeared in Navy Uniform Regulations in 1922, during which time the Navy was experimenting with lighter-than-air craft, as opposed to conventional, fixed-wing aircraft.

The Dirigible/Balloon Pilot Insignia was issued well into the 1970s, with occasional awards, on a case-by-case basis, to the end of the 20th century.  The 1978 U.S. Navy Uniform Regulations removed the Dirigible/Balloon Pilot Insignia from the authorized list of aviation breast insignia.  Although the Dirigible/Balloon Pilot Insignia is considered obsolete, it may still be found on various insignia and badge charts promulgated through U.S. Navy instructions and publications.

The Dirigible/Balloon Pilot Insignia appears as a “half-wing” version of the Naval Aviator Badge.  Its design was based on early versions of the Observer Badge.

See also
List of United States Navy enlisted warfare designations
Badges of the United States Navy
Obsolete badges of the United States military
Uniforms of the United States Navy

References

United States military badges